Naïve art is usually defined as visual art that is created by a person who lacks the formal education and training that a professional artist undergoes (in anatomy, art history, technique, perspective, ways of seeing).  When this aesthetic is emulated by a trained artist, the result is sometimes called primitivism, pseudo-naïve art, or faux naïve art.

Unlike folk art, naïve art does not necessarily derive from a distinct popular cultural context or tradition;  indeed, at least in the advanced economies and since the Printing Revolution, awareness of the local fine art tradition has been inescapable, as it diffused through popular prints and other media.  Naïve artists are aware of "fine art" conventions such as graphical perspective and compositional conventions, but are unable to fully use them, or choose not to. By contrast, outsider art (art brut) denotes works from a similar context but which have only minimal contact with the mainstream art world.

Naïve art is recognized, and often imitated, for its childlike simplicity and frankness.  Paintings of this kind typically have a flat rendering style with a rudimentary expression of perspective.  One particularly influential painter of "naïve art" was Henri Rousseau (1844–1910), a French Post-Impressionist who was discovered by Pablo Picasso.

The definition of the term, and its "borders" with neighbouring terms such as folk art and outsider art, has been a matter of some controversy.  Naïve art is a term usually used for the forms of fine art, such as paintings and sculptures, but made by a self-taught artist, while objects with a practical use come under folk art.  But this distinction has been disputed.  Another term that may be used, especially of paintings and architecture, is "provincial", essentially used for work by artists who had received some conventional training, but whose work unintentionally falls short of metropolitan or court standards.

Characteristics

Naïve art is often seen as outsider art that is by someone without formal (or little) training or degree.  While this was true before the twentieth century, there are now academies for naïve art. Naïve art is now a fully recognized art genre, represented in art galleries worldwide.

The characteristics of naïve art have an awkward relationship to the formal qualities of painting, especially not respecting the three rules of the perspective (such as defined by the Progressive Painters of the Renaissance):
 Decrease of the size of objects proportionally with distance,
 Muting of colors with distance,
 Decrease of the precision of details with distance,
The results are:
 Effects of perspective geometrically erroneous (awkward aspect of the works, children's drawings look, or medieval painting look, but the comparison stops there)
  Strong use of pattern, unrefined color on all the plans of the composition, without enfeeblement in the background,
 An equal accuracy brought to details, including those of the background which should be shaded off.
Simplicity rather than subtlety are all supposed markers of naïve art. It has, however, become such a popular and recognizable style that many examples could be called pseudo-naïve.

Whereas naïve art ideally describes the work of an artist who did not receive formal education in an art school or academy, for example Henri Rousseau or Alfred Wallis, 'pseudo naïve' or 'faux naïve' art describes the work of an artist working in a more imitative or self-conscious mode and whose work can be seen as more imitative than original.

Strict naïvety is unlikely to be found in contemporary artists, given the expansion of Autodidactism as a form of education in modern times. Naïve categorizations are not always welcome by living artists, but this is likely to change as dignifying signals are known. Museums devoted to naïve art now exist in Kecskemét, Hungary; Kovačica, Serbia; Riga, Latvia; Jaen, Spain; Rio de Janeiro, Brasil; Vicq France and Paris. Examples of English-speaking living artists who acknowledge their naïve style are: Gary Bunt, Lyle Carbajal, Gabe Langholtz, Gigi Mills, Barbara Olsen,  Paine Proffitt, and Alain Thomas.

"Primitive art" is another term often applied to art by those without formal training, but is historically more often applied to work from certain cultures that have been judged socially or technologically "primitive" by Western academia, such as Native American, subsaharan African or Pacific Island art (see Tribal art). This is distinguished from the self-conscious, "primitive" inspired movement primitivism. Another term related to (but not completely synonymous with) naïve art is folk art.

There also exist the terms "naïvism" and "primitivism" which are usually applied to professional painters working in the style of naïve art (like Paul Gauguin, Mikhail Larionov, Paul Klee).

Term
In 1870, in his poem Au Cabaret-Vert, 5 heures du soir, Arthur Rimbaud uses the word naïf to designate “clumsy” pictorial representations: “I contemplated the very naive subjects of the tapestry”, which is perhaps the case of the origin of the naïf employment by Guillaume Apollinaire some time later.

Movements 
Nobody knows exactly when the first naive artists appeared on the scene, as from the very first manifestations of art right up to the days of the "Modern Classic", naive artists quite unconsciously bequeathed us unmistakable signs of their creative activity. At all events, naive art can be regarded as having occupied an "official" position in the annals of twentieth-century art since – at the very latest – the publication of the Der Blaue Reiter, an almanac in 1912. Wassily Kandinsky and Franz Marc, who brought out the almanac, presented 6 reproductions of paintings by le Douanier' Rousseau (Henri Rousseau), comparing them with other pictorial examples. However, most experts agree that the year that naive art was "discovered" was 1885, when the painter Paul Signac became aware of the talents of Henri Rousseau and set about organizing exhibitions of his work in a number of prestigious galleries.

The Sacred Heart painters
German art collector and critic Wilhelm Uhde is known as the principal organiser of the first Naïve Art exhibition, which took place in Paris in 1928. The participants were Henri Rousseau, André Bauchant, Camille Bombois, Séraphine Louis and Louis Vivin, known collectively as the Sacred Heart painters.

Earth Group 
The Earth Group (Grupa Zemlja) were Croatian artists, architects and intellectuals active in Zagreb from 1929 to 1935. The group was Marxist in orientation and was partly modelled on "Neue Sachlichkeit", leading to more stylized forms, and the emergence of Naive painting. The group included the painters Krsto Hegedušić, Edo Kovačević, Omer Mujadžić, Kamilo Ružička, Ivan Tabaković, and Oton Postružnik, the sculptors Antun Augustinčić, Frano Kršinić, and the architect Drago Ibler. The Earth group searched for answers to social issues.  Their program emphasised the importance of independent creative expression, and opposed the uncritical copying of foreign styles. Rather than producing art for art's sake, they felt it ought to reflect the reality of life and the needs of the modern community. Activities at the group's exhibitions were increasingly provocative to the government of the day, and in 1935 the group was banned.

Hlebine School 
A term applied to Croatian naive painters working in or around the village of Hlebine, near the Hungarian border, from about 1930. At this time, according to the World Encyclopedia of Naive Art (1984), the village amounted to little more than 'a few muddy winding streets and one-storey houses', but it produced such a remarkable crop of artists that it became virtually synonymous with Yugoslav naive painting.

Hlebine is a small picturesque municipality in the North of Croatia that in 1920s became a setting against which a group of self-taught peasants began to develop a unique and somewhat revolutionary style of painting. This was instigated by leading intellectuals of the time such as the poet Antun Gustav Matoš and the biggest name in Croatian literature, Miroslav Krleža, who called for an individual national artistic style that would be independent from Western influences. These ideas were picked up by a celebrated artist from Hlebine – Krsto Hegedušić and he went on to found the Hlebine School of Art in 1930 in search of national “rural artistic expression”.

Ivan Generalić was the first master of the Hlebine School, and the first to develop a distinctive personal style, achieving a high standard in his art.

After the Second World War, the next generation of Hlebine painters tended to focus more on stylized depictions of country life taken from imagination. Generalić continued to be the dominant figure, and encouraged younger artists, including his son Josip Generalić.

The Hlebine school became a worldwide phenomenon with the 1952 Venice Biennale and exhibitions in Brazil and Brussels.

Some of the best known naive artists are   Dragan Gaži, Ivan Generalić, Josip Generalić, Krsto Hegedušić, Mijo Kovačić, Ivan Lacković-Croata, Franjo Mraz, Ivan Večenaj and Mirko Virius.

Artists 

See: List of Naïve art artists

Museums and galleries

 Croatian Museum of Naïve Art, Zagreb, Croatia
 Musée international d'Art naïf Anatole Jakovsky, Nice, France
 Musée d'Art Naïf – Max Fourny, Paris, France
 International Museum of Naive Art, Vicq, France
 Museum of Bad Art, Massachusetts
 National Folk Decorative Art Museum, Kyiv, Ukraine

See also
Anatole Jakovsky
Chicago Imagists
Neo-primitivism
Outsider art
Primitivism

References

Further reading 

 Walker, John. "Naive Art". Glossary of Art, Architecture & Design since 1945, 3rd. ed. (archived link, April 11, 2012)
 
 

 
Art movements
 02